1-Phosphatidylinositol-4,5-bisphosphate phosphodiesterase delta-4 is an enzyme that in humans is encoded by the PLCD4 gene.

References

Further reading

EC 3.1.4
EF-hand-containing proteins